Caleb Powell (1793 – 24 February 1881) was an Irish Repeal Association and Whig politician.

He was High Sheriff of County Limerick in 1858.

References

External links
 

UK MPs 1841–1847
Whig (British political party) MPs for Irish constituencies
High Sheriffs of County Limerick
1793 births
1881 deaths